Cluster of Differentiation 86 (also known as CD86 and B7-2) is a protein constitutively expressed on dendritic cells, Langerhans cells, macrophages, B-cells (including memory B-cells), and on other antigen-presenting cells. Along with CD80, CD86 provides costimulatory signals necessary for T cell activation and survival. Depending on the ligand bound, CD86 can signal for self-regulation and cell-cell association, or for attenuation of regulation and cell-cell disassociation.

The CD86 gene encodes a type I membrane protein that is a member of the immunoglobulin superfamily. Alternative splicing results in two transcript variants encoding different isoforms. Additional transcript variants have been described, but their full-length sequences have not been determined.

Structure 
CD86 belongs to the B7 family of the immunoglobulin superfamily. It is a 70 kDa glycoprotein made up of 329 amino acids. Both CD80 and CD86 share a conserved amino acid motif that forms their ligand binding domain. CD86 consists of Ig-like extracellular domains (one variable and one constant), a transmembrane region and a short cytoplasmic domain that is longer than that of CD80. costimulatory ligands CD80 and CD86 can be found on professional antigen presenting cells such as monocytes, dendritic cells, and even activated B-cells. They can also be induced on other cell types, for example T cells. CD86 expression is more abundant compared to CD80, and upon its activation is CD86 increased faster than CD80.

At the protein level, CD86 shares 25% identity with CD80 and both are coded on human chromosome 3q13.33q21.

Role in co-stimulation, T-cell activation and inhibition 
CD86 and CD80 bind as ligands to costimulatory molecule CD28 on the surface of all naïve T cells, and to the inhibitory receptor CTLA-4 (cytotoxic T-lymphocyte antigen-4, also known as CD152). CD28 and CTLA-4 have important, but opposite roles in the stimulation of T cells. Binding to CD28 promotes T cell responses, while binding to CTLA-4 inhibits them.

The interaction between CD86 (CD80) expressed on the surface of an antigen-presenting cell with CD28 on the surface of a mature, naive T-cell, is required for T-cell activation. To become activated, lymphocyte must engage both antigen and costimulatory ligand on the same antigen-presenting cell. T cell receptor (TCR) interacts with major histocompatibility complex (MHC) class II molecules, and this signalization must be accompanied by costimulatory signals, provided by a costimulatory ligand. These costimulatory signals are necessary to prevent anergy and are provided by the interaction between CD80/CD86 and CD28 costimulatory molecule.

This protein interaction is also essential for T lymphocytes to receive the full activation signal, which in turn leads to T cell differentiation and division, production of interleukin 2 and clonal expansion. Interaction between CD86 and CD28 activates mitogen-activated protein kinase and transcription factor nf-κB in the T-cell. These proteins up-regulate production of CD40L (used in B-cell activation), IL-21 and IL-21R (used for division/proliferation), and IL-2, among other cytokines. The interaction also regulates self-tolerance by supporting the homeostatis of CD4+CD25+ Tregulatory cell, also known as Tregs.

CTLA-4 is a coinhibitory molecule that is induced on activated T cells. Interaction between CTLA-4 and CD80/CD86 leads to delivery of negative signals into T cells and reduction of number of costimulatory molecules on the cell surface. It can also trigger a signaling pathway responsible for expression of enzyme IDO (indolamine-2,3-dioxygenase). This enzyme can metabolize amino acid tryptophan, which is an important component for successful proliferation and differentiation of T lymphocytes. IDO reduces the concentration of tryptophan in the environment, thereby suppressing the activation of conventional T cells, while also promoting the function of regulatory T cells. 

Both CD80 and CD86 bind CTLA-4 with higher affinity than CD28. This allows CTLA-4 to outcompete CD28 for CD80/CD86 binding. Between CD80 and CD86, CD80 appears to have a higher affinity for both CTLA-4 and CD28 than CD86. This suggest that CD80 is more potent ligand than CD86, but studies using CD80 and CD86 knockout mice have shown that CD86 is more important in T cell activation than CD80.

Treg mediation 

Pathways in the B7:CD28 family have key roles in the regulation of T cell activation and tolerance. Their negative second signals are responsible for downregulation of cell responses. For all these reasons are these pathways considered as therapeutic targets.

Regulatory T cells produce CTLA-4. Due to its interaction with CD80/CD86, Tregs can compete with conventional T cells and block their costimulatory signals. Treg expression of CTLA-4 can effectively downregulate both CD80 and CD86 on APCs, suppress the immune response and lead to increased anergy.  Since CTLA-4 binds to CD86 with higher affinity than CD28, the co-stimulation necessary for proper T-cell activation is also affected. It was shown in a work from Sagurachi group that Treg cells were able to downregulate CD80 and CD86, but not CD40 or MHC class II on DC in a way that was adhesion dependent. Downregulation was blocked by anti-CTLA-4 antibody and was cancelled if Treg cells were CTLA-4 deficient.

When bound to CTLA-4, CD86 can be removed from the surface of an APC and onto the Treg cell in a process called trogocytosis. Blocking this process with anti-CTLA-4 antibodies is useful for a specific type of cancer immunotherapy called "Cancer therapy by inhibition of negative immune regulation". Japanese immunologist Tasuku Honjo and American immunologist James P. Allison won the Nobel Prize in Physiology or Medicine in 2018 for their work on this topic.

Role in pathology 
Roles of both CD80 and CD86 are studied in context of many pathologies. Selective inhibition of costimulatory inhibitors was examined in a model of allergic pulmonary inflammation and airway hyper-responsiveness (AHR). Since initial host response to Staphylococcus aureus, especially the immune response based on T cells, is a contributing factor in the pathogenesis of acute pneumonia, role of the CD80/CD86 pathway in pathogenesis was investigated. The costimulatory molecules were also investigated in context of Bronchial Astma, Treg in cancer, and immunotherapy.

See also 
 Cluster of differentiation
 CD80
 CD28
 CTLA-4
 List of human clusters of differentiation for a list of CD molecules

References

External links

Further reading 

 
 
 
 
 
 
 
 
 
 
 
 
 
 
 
 
 
 
 
 

Clusters of differentiation